Huan County or Huanxian is an administrative district in eastern Gansu province, China at the junction of three provinces: Gansu, Shaanxi to the northeast, and Ningxia to the west and northwest. It is under the administration of the prefecture-level city of Qingyang.

Its postal code is 745700, and the population in 2019 was 316703.

Huanxian is known as one of the first places in China where agriculture was practiced. It was part of ancient Yongzhou. In 994 it was known as Huanzhou. In 1369 it became known as Huanxian. In 1669 Huanxian and the governing Qingyang were transferred from Shaanxi to Gansu.

Administrative divisions
Huan County is divided to 10 towns, 10 townships  and 1 other.
Towns

Townships

Others
 Siheyuan Tourism Development Office()

Climate

Economy 
Huanxian has extensive coal resources and home to the Changqing Oilfield. Several wind farms have also been constructed in Huanxian. It is also an important agricultural base for grains.

The county is considered poor, due to the arid climate making agriculture difficult, and the mountainous terrain hindering transport.

Tourism 
Parts of the Qin Great Wall are located in the south of Huanxian.

Culture 
Huanxian food specialities include lamb meat, Huangjiu, buckwheat noodles, and Yanmian Rourou noodles.

Huanxian is also known for its shadow play, which has been listed by UNESCO as intangible cultural heritage. It is called the home of shadow theatre in China.

Transportation 
China National Highway 211
China National Highway 341 (under construction)
G69 Yinchuan–Baise Expressway
Yinchuan–Xi'an high-speed railway

See also
 List of administrative divisions of Gansu

References

County-level divisions of Gansu
Qingyang